This is a list of Inter Milan honours. Inter Milan is an Italian football club. This article contains historical and current trophies pertaining to the club.

National titles (34)

Italian Football Championship/Serie A:
Winners (19): 1909–10, 1919–20, 1929–30, 1937–38, 1939–40, 1952–53, 1953–54, 1962–63, 1964–65, 1965–66, 1970–71, 1979–80, 1988–89, 2005–06, 2006–07, 2007–08, 2008–09, 2009–10, 2020–21
Runners-up (16): 1932–33, 1933–34, 1934–35, 1940–41, 1948–49, 1950–51, 1961–62, 1963–64, 1966–67, 1969–70, 1992–93, 1997–98, 2002–03, 2010–11, 2019–20, 2021–22

Coppa Italia:
Winners (8): 1938–39, 1977–78, 1981–82, 2004–05, 2005–06, 2009–10, 2010–11, 2021–22
Runners-up (6): 1958–59, 1964–65, 1976–77, 1999–2000, 2006–07, 2007–08

Supercoppa Italiana:
Winners (7): 1989, 2005, 2006, 2008, 2010, 2021, 2022
Runners-up (4): 2000, 2007, 2009, 2011

European titles (6)
European Cup/UEFA Champions League:
Winners (3): 1963–64, 1964–65, 2009–10
Runners-up (2): 1966–67, 1971–72

UEFA Cup/UEFA Europa League:
Winners (3): 1990–91, 1993–94, 1997–98
Runners-up (2): 1996–97, 2019–20

UEFA Super Cup:
Runners-up (1): 2010

Mitropa Cup:
Runners-up (1): 1933

Worldwide titles (3)

 Intercontinental Cup:
Winners (2): 1964, 1965

FIFA Club World Cup:
Winners (1): 2010

Intercontinental Supercup:
Runners-up (1): 1968

Friendly competitions (48)
Campionato De Martino
Winners (8): 1956–57, 1957–58, 1958–59, 1960–61, 1961–62, 1962–63, 1965–66, 1974–75

Mundialito de Clubs
Winners (1): 1981

Santiago Bernabéu Trophy
Winners (2): 1993, 2001

Memorial Armando Picchi
Winners (1): 1995
Runners-up (1): 1971

Pirelli Cup
Winners (11): 1996, 1997, 2000, 2001, 2002, 2003, 2006, 2007, 2008, 2009, 2010
Runners-up (4): 1998, 1999, 2004, 2005

Valle d'Aosta Trophy
Winners (1): 1998
Runners-up (1): 2000

Birra Moretti Trophy
Winners (3): 2001, 2002, 2007
Runners-up (3): 1997, 1999, 2000

TIM Trophy
Winners (8): 2002, 2003, 2004, 2005, 2007, 2010, 2011, 2012
Runners-up (1): 2009

Ciudat de Palma Trophy
Winners (1) : 2006

Bahrain Cup
Winners (1) : 2007

Franz Beckenbauer-Cup
Winners (1): 2008

Eusébio Cup
Winners (1): 2008

Luigi Berlusconi Trophy
Winners (1): 2015
Runners-up (1): 1992

Marbella Cup
Winners (1): 2017

International Champions Cup
Winners (1): Singapore 2017

110 Summer Cup
Winners (1): 2018

Casinò Lugano Cup
Winners (1): 2019

International Super Cup
Winners (1): 2019

Orange Trophy
Winners (1): 2019

Lugano Region Cup
Winners (1): 2021

Lugano Supercup
Winners (1): 2022

Footnotes

References

External links
Inter Milan honours at Inter.it

Honours